The Berkeley Memorial stands in the centre of the Circus in Basseterre, Saint Kitts and Nevis. The memorial features a drinking fountain as well as a clock. There are four clock faces, each one facing one of the four streets leading to the Circus. It was built in honour of Thomas Berkeley Hardtman Berkeley, a former president of the General Legislative Council in the 1880s.

Architecture 
The structure contains a clock and a fountain and was designed and built by George Smith and Co. from Glasgow, Scotland. The foundry produced two other similar structures, but only that of Saint-Christophe survived.

References

Monuments and memorials in North America
Buildings and structures in Basseterre
Drinking fountains